Las Lomas  is a corregimiento in La Pintada District, Coclé Province, Panama. It was created by Law 56 of December 5, 2002.

References

Corregimientos of Coclé Province